Bond events are North Atlantic ice rafting events that are tentatively linked to climate fluctuations in the Holocene. Eight such events have been identified.

Gerard C. Bond of the Lamont–Doherty Earth Observatory at Columbia University was the lead author of the 1997 paper that postulated the theory of 1470-year climate cycles in the Late Pleistocene and Holocene, mainly based on petrologic tracers of drift ice in the North Atlantic. However, more recent work has shown that these tracers provide little support for 1,500-year intervals of climate change, and the reported  period was a statistical artifact. 

Furthermore, following publication of the Greenland Ice Core Chronology 2005 (GICC05) for the North GRIP ice core, it became clear that Dansgaard–Oeschger events also show no such pattern. The North Atlantic ice-rafting events happen to correlate with episodes of lowered lake levels in the Mid-Atlantic region of the United States, the weakest events of the Asian monsoon for at least the past 9,000 years, and also correlate with most aridification events in the Middle East for the past 55,000 years (both Heinrich and Bond events).

List

Most Bond events do not have a clear climate signal; some correspond to periods of cooling, but others are coincident with aridification in some regions. Gap between events has been estimated to be 1,000-1,500 years with Bond event # 4 as an outlying data point.

Influence in regional climate

Bond events have been detected in remote regions such as the central Andes of South America. 

Up to six Bond cycles during the upper and middle Holocene have been identified in three ice core records of the tropical Andes. The records were extracted from the summits of Nevado Sajama, Nevado Huascarán and Nevado Illimani. The detected cycles were at 6400 years Before Present, 5500 years B.P., 3700 years B.P., 2700 years B.P., 1300 years B.P. and 200 years B.P. and represented temperature drops.

See also
Ice-sheet dynamics
Heinrich event

References

History of climate variability and change
Atlantic Ocean